The Treaty of Melfi or Concordat of Melfi was signed on 23 August 1059 between Pope Nicholas II and the Norman princes Robert Guiscard and Richard I of Capua. Based on the terms of the accord, the Pope recognized the Norman conquest of Southern Italy. Moreover, the Pope recognized Robert Guiscard as Duke of Apulia and Calabria, and as Count of Sicily.

See also
Battle of Civitate 
List of treaties

External links
Timelines
Chronology - History of Naples

1059
Melfi
Melfi
Treaties of the Duchy of Normandy